Corgarff Castle is located slightly west of the village of Corgarff, in Aberdeenshire, north-east Scotland. It stands by the Lecht road, which crosses the pass between Strathdon and Tomintoul.

Life

The castle was built around 1530 by the Elphinstone family and leased to the Forbes of Towie. In 1571 it was burned by their enemy, Adam Gordon of Auchindoun, resulting in the deaths of Margaret Campbell, Lady Forbes, her children, and numerous others, 26 in total, and giving rise to the ballad Edom o Gordon.

In May 1607 the castle was captured from Alexander, 4th Lord Elphinstone by Alexander Forbes of Towie and his companions, including a piper called George McRobie. They used hammers and battering rams to break down the gate, then fortified the house with a garrison of "Highland thieves and limmers".

In 1626 it was acquired by the Earl of Mar. In 1645 it was used as an assembly point by the troops of the Marquis of Montrose. It was burned again in both 1689 and 1716 by Jacobite supporters. It was resettled by the Forbes family in 1745 but had to be forfeited due to their Jacobite leanings.

In 1748 it was bought by the British government and rebuilt and extended as a barracks. A detachment of government troops were stationed there, on the military road from Braemar Castle to Fort George, Inverness. Military use continued as late as 1831, after which the tower was used to suppress illegal whisky distilling in the surrounding area. It remained part of the Delnadamph estate belonging to the Stockdale family until they passed the castle into state care in 1961 and gave the ownership of the castle to the Lonach Highland and Friendly Society.

It is now in the care of Historic Environment Scotland and is open to the public. It has been designated a scheduled ancient monument.

References

External links 
Historic Environment Scotland: Visitor guide
360 Photographic Virtual Tour: Snow Covered 360 Virtual Tour of Corgarff grounds 

Castles in Aberdeenshire
Museums in Aberdeenshire
Military and war museums in Scotland
Historic house museums in Aberdeenshire
Historic Scotland properties in Aberdeenshire
Scheduled Ancient Monuments in Aberdeenshire
Tower houses in Scotland